Barrowford is one of the 20 electoral wards that form the Parliamentary constituency of Pendle, Lancashire, England. The ward returns three councillors, currently all Conservatives, to represent the village of Barrowford on Pendle Borough Council. As of the May 2011 Council election, Barrowford had an electorate of 4,070.

Demographics
Barrowford has an older-than-average population compared to both Pendle and England, with 23.4 per cent of residents aged 60 or over. It also has a considerably higher proportion of white residents than the local average.

Election results

References

Wards of Pendle (UK Parliament constituency)